Chidchob is a Thai surname. Notable people with the surname include:

Chai Chidchob (1928–2020), Thai politician
Newin Chidchob (born 1958), Thai politician, son of Chai
Saksayam Chidchob (born 1962), Thai politician

Thai-language surnames